Afroditi Theopeftatou (born 23 May 1957) is a Greek civil engineer and politician, member of the Council of the Hellenes from 2012 until 11 January 2019. Born in Athens, she is a graduate of the Polytechnic School of the University of Patras and worked as a civil engineer.

During her student years she was a member of the Greek Communist Youth – Rigas Feraios. She was elected MP of Cephalonia with SYRIZA in the May and June 2012 elections and in the January and September 2015 elections.

She also was the secretary of the SYRIZA Parliamentary Group.

References

1957 births
Living people
20th-century Greek politicians
21st-century Greek politicians
20th-century Greek women politicians
21st-century Greek women politicians
Greek socialists
Syriza politicians
Engineers from Athens
Politicians from Athens
Greek women engineers